The Rey del Fútbol de América ("King of Football of America"), often referred to as the South American Footballer of the Year, is an annual association football award presented to the best footballer in South America over the previous calendar year. The award was conceived by Venezuelan newspaper El Mundo, which awarded it from 1971 to 1992. Uruguayan newspaper El País took over from 1986 onwards, and their award was considered official, but El Mundo continued their award until 1992.

Originally for the El Mundo award, journalists could vote for any South American and Central American players at any club around the world. From 1986 the El País award became official and only South American players playing in South America were eligible. From 1998, eligibility extended to South Americans playing in Mexico due to the participation of Mexican clubs in the Copa Libertadores.

From 1980 to 1983 the Argentinian newspaper El Gráfico also chose their El Futbolista De América ("Footballer of the Americas"). Any South American player playing the Americas at any point in the year was eligible.

The inaugural winner was Tostão of Cruzeiro. Three players have won the award three times each: Elías Figueroa of Internacional, Zico of Flamengo, and Carlos Tevez of Boca Juniors and Corinthians; Figueroa and Tevez did so in consecutive years. As of 2021, Brazilian players have won the most awards (16), with Argentinian players a close second with 15 wins. Argentine club River Plate have had the most winners with nine awards. The most recent recipient of the award is Julián Álvarez of River Plate, who won in the 2021 season.

Winners

El Mundo award (1971–1985) 

The award was officially awarded by newspaper El Mundo to the best South American footballer between 1971 and 1985. El Mundo continued their award until 1992, but it isn't considered official.

Unofficial El Mundo award (1986–1992)

El Gráfico award (1980–1983) 
From 1980 to 1983 El Gráfico gave out their Footballer of the Americas award.

El País award (1986–present) 

From 1986, the South American Footballer of the Year was named by El País.

Wins by player

Wins by nationality

Wins by club

See also
 South American Coach of the Year
 UEFA Men's Player of the Year Award

References

External links
 Diario El Mundo
 Diario El Pais

South American football trophies and awards
 
South
Awards established in 1971